The Waterford, Limerick and Western Railway (WL&WR), formerly the Waterford and Limerick Railway up to 1896, was at the time it was amalgamated with the Great Southern and Western Railway in 1901 the fourth largest railway in Ireland, with a main line stretching from Limerick to Waterford and branches to Sligo and Tralee.

Inception
The Limerick & Waterford Railway Act was passed by the Parliament of the United Kingdom on 31 May 1826 and had the distinction of being the first act authorising an Irish railway. No construction followed and it was 1845 before the Waterford & Limerick Railway was authorised, the first section of the line being opened from Limerick to Tipperary on 9 May 1848, the remainder of the main line being opened in stages, finally reaching Waterford in 1854.

Secondary lines
The company eventually operated two long branch lines which extended from Limerick, north west to Sligo and south west to Tralee.

Branch lines
By 1900, there were a number of branch lines:
Ballingrane to Foynes, (opened by the Limerick & Foynes Railway 1858, purchased by WL&WR 1873)
 Killonan to Killaloe, (opened by Limerick Castleconnell & Killaloe Railway between 1858 and 1867, purchased by WL&WR 1873)  
Clonmel to Thurles, (opened by Southern Railway of Ireland 1880)
 Tralee to Fenit, an  section opened in 1887 by the Tralee & Fenit Railway.

People
The W&LR was generally short of cash to maintain rolling stock and most locomotive superintendents who were typically did not stay long.  Incumbents included:
 Thomas Lunt, who came from the Liverpool and Manchester Railway and was in position from 1853 to 1857.
 Jonathan Pim, son for James Pim, locomotive superintendent from 1857 to 1861.
 Martin Atock was locomotive superintendent from 1861 until 1871.
 John G. Robinson was locomotive, carriage and wagon assistant superintendent of the railway from 1889 till 1900 when he moved to a similar position with the Great Central Railway.

Amalgamation
In 1900, the GS&WR and WL&WR Amalgamation Act was passed by the House of Commons and the WL&WR finally lost its independence on 1 January 1901.

Livery
The WL&WR locomotives were painted a medium green until 1876 and was replaced by a brown livery with blue and yellow lining. In the late 1880s, J.G. Robinson introduced a crimson lake livery with gold lining for both passenger locomotives and coaching stock, very close to that of the Midland Railway of England. Goods engines were painted black with red and white lining.

Present day
The former WL&WR lines operational in 2010 are owned by Iarnród Éireann. The main line route from Limerick to Waterford and the line to Ennis remain open to passenger traffic. The extension of the line from Ennis to Athenry (for Galway) was officially re-opened on 29 March 2010. These lines are part of the Western Railway Corridor.

See also
History of rail transport in Ireland
Rail transport in Ireland
Iarnród Éireann

References

Sources

Further reading

External links 
WL&WR at Irishrailwayana.com

Defunct railway companies of Ireland
Irish gauge railways
Railway companies established in 1826
Railway companies disestablished in 1901
1826 establishments in Ireland